Echinodiscus tenuissimus is a species of sea urchin.

References

Astriclypeidae